Phyllis Ann Bird (born 1934) is an American feminist scholar in biblical hermeneutics. She is Professor Emerita of Old Testament Interpretation at Garrett–Evangelical Theological Seminary and McCarthy Professor of Biblical Studies at the Pontifical Biblical Institute. Bird is an ordained elder in the United Methodist Church, and was one of the translators of the New Revised Standard Version.

Books 
 Missing Persons and Mistaken Identities: Women and Gender in Ancient Israel  OCLC 37310780
 The Bible as the Church's Book  OCLC 8430410

See also
 Historical criticism

References

1934 births
20th-century Christian biblical scholars
20th-century Methodist ministers
American biblical scholars
American United Methodist clergy
Christian feminist biblical scholars
Female biblical scholars
Garrett–Evangelical Theological Seminary faculty
Harvard Divinity School alumni
Living people
Methodist biblical scholars
Old Testament scholars
Academic staff of the Pontifical Biblical Institute
Southern Methodist University faculty
Translators of the Bible into English
Union Theological Seminary (New York City) alumni
Female Bible Translators